The 2022 New York City FC II season will be the inaugural season of New York City FC's development team. They will compete in MLS Next Pro, a new league sitting on the third tier of the United States soccer league system, and partly serving as a development league for Major League Soccer.

Player movement

In

Current roster 
Current as of April 24, 2022.

Non-competitive

Competitive

MLS Next Pro

Standings

Eastern Conference

Overall table

Matches

References

New York City FC II
New York City FC II
2022
New York City FC II